Blackwell Glacier is in the U.S. state of Montana. The glacier is situated immediately north of Snowshoe Peak in the Cabinet Mountains. The glacier consists of numerous small ice patches.

References

See also
 List of glaciers in the United States

Glaciers of Lincoln County, Montana
Glaciers of Montana